Mount Silisili is the highest peak in Samoa and the Samoa Islands chain. It is located in the centre of a mountain chain running the length of Savai'i island.

Mount Silisili rises to a height of 1,858 m. The word silisili means highest in reference to height, in the Samoan language.

Savai'i is the largest shield volcano island in the South Pacific.

Climbing the volcano 
Mount Silisili makes a popular hike of Savai'i island, and can be reached with a 2-day guided round-trip.

See also
 Mount Matavanu, active volcano on Savai'i, last erupted 1905 - 1911.
 Mata o le Afi, a volcano on Savai'i, last erupted 30 October 1902 to 17 November 1902.
 Mauga Afi, a volcano on Savai'i, last erupted about 1725.

References

Mountains of Samoa
Volcanoes of Samoa
Gaga'ifomauga
Highest points of countries
Savai'i